Stephen Wright (born 27 August 1971) is a Scottish former footballer who played as a right-back. Wright is currently the Head of Academy for Dundee.

Playing career

Club
Raised in Hamilton, Wright started his career with Aberdeen – progressing through the ranks alongside Eoin Jess and Scott Booth – and made 181 first team appearances for the Dons; he was part of the squad that came close to winning the League title on the last day of the Scottish Premier League in the 1990–91 season, and achieved further league runners-up finishes in 1992–93 and 1993–94, as well as reaching the 1992 Scottish League Cup Final and 1993 Scottish Cup Final, losing out to Rangers on every occasion. In 1994–95 the club's results were unexpectedly poor and they escaped relegation only via a play-off; these turned out to be Wright's last matches for the club, and the situation also meant his wedding took place in the short time between the regular season and the matches against Dunfermline Athletic rather than in a more relaxed atmosphere after its conclusion, as he had planned.

In the summer of 1995, he joined his boyhood heroes (and Aberdeen's main rivals) Rangers for £1.5m. Much of his time at Ibrox was spent injured, following a rupture of the anterior cruciate ligament in his knee during a UEFA Champions League match against Juventus in his first season. After just seven league appearances in three years (his spell with the Gers coincided almost exactly with that of Paul Gascoigne who in contrast played over 100 times), Wright had a loan spell with Wolverhampton Wanderers before joining Bradford City in 1998, where he reunited with former Rangers teammate Stuart McCall and helped the club gain promotion to the Premier League in his first season, although he did not make a league appearance in his second.

Those two years with the Bantams preceded another two back in Scotland with Dundee United, where he took an interest in the coaching aspect of the game, before he finished his playing career in 2002 with a short spell at Scunthorpe United.

International
Wright won two international caps while playing for Aberdeen, in March and May 1993.

Coaching career
Wright joined Dunfermline Athletic as first-team coach in January 2008, moving from a youth coaching role at Rangers.

He coached with Fife Elite Football Academy (developing players for the Fife region's four professional clubs: Cowdenbeath, Dunfermline Athletic, East Fife and Raith Rovers) for nearly a decade before returning to Rangers in May 2017.

Wright became the Head of Academy at Dundee F.C. in February 2019.

References

External links
 

Profile and stats at AFC Heritage Trust

Bradford profile at Sporting-Heroes.net

1971 births
Living people
Footballers from Bellshill
Aberdeen F.C. players
Bradford City A.F.C. players
Dundee United F.C. players
Rangers F.C. players
Scotland B international footballers
Scotland international footballers
Scottish Football League players
Scottish footballers
Scottish Premier League players
Scunthorpe United F.C. players
English Football League players
Wolverhampton Wanderers F.C. players
Scotland under-21 international footballers
Rangers F.C. non-playing staff
Association football fullbacks
Dundee F.C. non-playing staff